A Place Where the Sun Is Silent is the fourth studio album by Alesana. It was released through Epitaph Records on October 18, 2011. The album was produced by Kris Crummett, who also worked on The Emptiness. Being the second concept album released by Alesana, A Place Where the Sun Is Silent was inspired by the epic poem The Inferno by Dante Alighieri.

On August 24, 2011 Alternative Press premiered the first song off the album, "A Gilded Masquerade" and on September 21, 2011 the magazine premiered the second song off the album, "A Forbidden Dance" before later showcasing the entire album off the website. On October 4, 2011, the band released a music video for "Circle VII: Sins of The Lion", with live performance clips. On December 6, 2011 Alesana released the music video for "Lullaby of the Crucified".

The album is currently the longest release by the band, running at 1 hour and 2 minutes total (excluding the deluxe edition's bonus tracks). iTunes mistakenly labeled the titles some of the track (scores) in the deluxe version of the record.

The song "Circle VII: Sins of the Lion" was voted the best song of 2011 by readers of Revolver.

Track listing

iTunes labeled the tracks 18, 19 & 20 incorrectly. Track 18 (Vestige) is supposed to be Circle VII: Sins Of The Lion; Track 19 (Lullaby of the Crucified) should be Vestige; and Track 20 is supposed to be Lullaby of the Crucified instead of Before Him All Shall Scatter.

Personnel
Alesana
Dennis Lee – unclean vocals
Shawn Milke – lead vocals,  piano, rhythm guitar 
Patrick Thompson – lead guitar, backing vocals
Alex Torres – rhythm guitar, backing vocals, lead guitar
Shane Crump – bass, backing vocals
Jeremy Bryan – drums
 
Guest musicians
 Melissa Milke – female vocals
 Adam Fisher – spoken word vocals

Production
 Kris Crummett – producer

Chart performance

References

2011 albums
Alesana albums
Epitaph Records albums
Albums produced by Kris Crummett
Concept albums
Music based on Inferno (Dante)